The Parti social démocratique du Québec (PSD) was the Quebec wing of the Co-operative Commonwealth Federation. It was founded in 1939 as the Fédération du Commonwealth Coopératif and was led by Romuald-Joseph Lamoureux in the 1944 general election, by Thérèse Casgrain from 1951 to 1957 and by Michel Chartrand from 1957 to 1960. The name Parti social démocratique was adopted in 1955.

The party was refounded in 1963 as the New Democratic Party of Quebec (Nouveau Parti démocratique du Québec), however the party soon split over the issue of Quebec self-determination with Quebec nationalists leaving to form, in November 1963, the Parti socialiste du Québec led by former PSD leader Michel Chartrand.

The NDPQ renamed itself the Parti de la Democratie Socialiste (Party of Socialist Democracy) following a 1991 split with the federal NDP over the question of Quebec independence.

General election results

 A candidate ran as "CCF candidate" in the 1936 Quebec general election, although the Quebec section of the party had not been founded yet.

Members of Legislative Assembly of Quebec
David Côté, MLA 1944-1948, Rouyn-Noranda

See also

 Politics of Quebec
 List of Quebec general elections
 List of Quebec premiers
 List of Quebec leaders of the Opposition
 National Assembly of Quebec
 Timeline of Quebec history
 Political parties in Quebec

References

External links
 National Assembly historical information
 La Politique québécoise sur le Web

Provincial political parties in Quebec
Political parties established in 1939
Quebec
1939 establishments in Quebec
Social democratic parties in Canada
Defunct provincial political parties in Quebec
New Democratic Party of Quebec